The Army of the West was the name of the United States force commanded by Stephen W. Kearny during the Mexican–American War, which played a prominent role in the conquest of New Mexico and California.

It was headquartered at Fort Leavenworth, Kansas. After the war, it was broken up into the Department of the Pacific and the Department of the West.

New Mexico
Colonel Stephen W. Kearny initially commanded some 1,700 regular army and volunteer soldiers mustering at Fort Leavenworth, Kansas. Kearny was promoted to brigadier general, and he designated the force the Army of the West and advanced on the Santa Fe trail by the end of June 1846. Other American forces followed including Colonel Sterling Price and the Second Missouri Mounted Volunteer Regiment and the famous Mormon Battalion, the only religious unit in American military history. Months later the 1st New York Volunteer Infantry and some regular army units arrived by ship in California. Kearny moved into present day New Mexico and seized Santa Fe, establishing a military government there. Kearny dispatched forces under Colonel Alexander Doniphan for further operations in New Mexico while Kearny with the remaining forces of the army proceeded overland towards California, guided by Kit Carson. Colonel Sterling Price was left in command of U.S. troops in New Mexico. The forces left behind in New Mexico were still regarded as part of Army of the West. Price was able to successfully put down the Taos Revolt in the early part of 1847. Eventually the Army of the West would have some 4,000–5,000 soldiers operating in California, New Mexico and also Doniphan's regiment and its expedition in Chihuahua.

California
Believing that Californian resistance had ended, Kearny brought only one company of his troops from Santa Fe. When he moved into the northern (Alta) section of the Las Californias department of Mexico (the Baja California peninsula was included in the same department), however, he found a rebellion in progress. Kearny attacked a Californian force led by General Andrés Pico at the Battle of San Pasqual. Though the Californians were forced from the field, the attack was a costly one. General Kearny, himself wounded, required reinforcements from the garrison at San Diego to relieve his position and move the wounded to safety. Once in San Diego, Kearny's force was augmented with reinforcements of marines and naval infantry under Commodore Robert F. Stockton's command. With a combined force now numbering 500, Kearny and Stockton moved north to attack Pico's Californians near Los Angeles. U.S. forces took control of the city on January 10, 1847 after having won the battles of Rio San Gabriel and La Mesa. On January 13, the Californians surrendered to John C. Fremont, ending the major fighting in California. Kearny moved to Monterey and stayed on until May as military governor of California.

Chihuahua
In late 1846, General Stephen W. Kearny began his march west to California. He left three companies of Dragoons to form, with volunteer troops, a strong garrison in New Mexico. Command of the garrison eventually was placed with Colonel Sterling Price. The last major action of the army came in 1848 when Price, recently promoted to the rank of general, invaded the state of Chihuahua and defeated a Mexican force at the Battle of Santa Cruz de Rosales. This battle occurred after a cease fire and the Treaty of Guadalupe Hidalgo had been signed.

In 1862, Sterling Price would command another force named Army of the West, this time as part of the Confederate States Army during the American Civil War.

Order of battle at Santa Cruz de Rosales
 Commander – Brigadier General Sterling Price

Major battles
 Battle of Santa Fe
 Battle of San Pasqual
 Battle of Rio San Gabriel
 Battle of La Mesa
 Taos Revolt
 Battle of Santa Cruz de Rosales

See also
 Army of Occupation (Mexico)
 Bent's Old Fort National Historic Site
 Fort Marcy (New Mexico)
 John Strother Griffin, physician with this unit

References
 The Mexican War Correspondence of Richard Smith Elliott, 
 
 Eisenhower, John. So Far From God: The U.S. War with Mexico, Random House (1989).

External links
 A Continent Divided: The U.S. - Mexico War, Center for Greater Southwestern Studies, the University of Texas at Arlington

Army of the West
Conquest of California
New Mexico and Arizona campaign